Paambhu Sattai is a 2017 Indian Tamil-language action thriller film written and directed by debutant Adam Dasan, starring Bobby Simha and Keerthy Suresh. Guru Somasundaram, Bhanu and Charle appear in supporting roles. Produced by actor Manobala, the film has music composed by Ajeesh. After beginning its shoot in 2014, the film released after an extended delay on 24 March 2017.

Plot 
Dakshna Murthy (Bobby Simha) is a young man who keeps losing his jobs frequently because of his moral ethics. Malar (Bhanu) his sister-in-law is a confident, young, beautiful woman who works in a jewelry shop. Malar lost her husband (Dakshna's brother) within a month of their marriage. For reasons unknown, her husband is found dead on the railway tracks nearby their hamlet. Despite being a young widow, both Malar and Dakshna live under the same roof because Malar has married his brother opposing her family. Dakshna tries to convince his sister-in-law to remarry, but she keeps refusing.

Dakshna gets a job in a water-can distribution shop. The nature of his job introduces him to different kinds of people. Over the course of time, he falls in love with a girl named Veni (Keerthy Suresh) who works in a garment factory and is also one of his water-can customers. Veni's father, a manual scavenger accepts their love but doubts the relationship between Dakshna and Malar. As a result, Malar accepts for a second marriage. Dakshna finds the right groom for Malar, but he is not ready for marriage because of his financial constraints. Dakshna decides to gather money to fix Jeeva's financial problem so that Malar can marry again. In this journey, many good people around him help with some cash, yet he falls short of money.

Cast 

 Bobby Simha as Therukutharulam Dabusi Dakshna Murthy
 Keerthy Suresh as Veni
 Guru Somasundaram as Rajendran
 Bhanu as Malar
 Charle as Kannan, Veni's Father
 K. Rajan as Shanmugam
 R. V. Udayakumar
 Rajendran as Murugan
 Saravana Subbiah as Boxer
 PV Chandramoulli
 Shan
 Nivas Adithan
 Lizzie Antony
 Baby Teja
 John Ranjith as Rahul
 Mathew Varghese as Ramlal Seth
 Nagendra Prasad as himself (special appearance -  "Ichukkattaa")
 Chandini Tamilarasan as herself (special appearance -  "Ichukkattaa")

Production 
Production of the film began in late 2014, with Bobby Simha and Keerthy Suresh signed on to play the lead roles in Adam Dasan's first film. The film was initially started as a joint venture between Manobala's Picture House studio and Magic Frames, consisting of Listin Stephen, Sarathkumar and Raadhika. Muktha Bhanu finished filming her scenes in March 2015, and revealed that she would portray a salesgirl. The film was completed in mid-2015 and dubbing work was underway by July 2015.

After a long production delay, it was announced that the film had been sold to K. Gangadharan of Cinema City, who planned to release the film in December 2016. Following further delays, the film was released with the assistance of Abi & Abi Pictures during March 2017.

Soundtrack 

Playback singer Ajeesh composed both songs and background score for this film, making his composing debut. His work on the film prompted the lead actor Bobby Simha to sign him on for his home production, Vallavanukkum Vallavan (2017).

Release 
The film had a low-profile release across Tamil Nadu on 24 March 2017, following up from the delays it had during production. Reviewing the film, Behindwoods.com wrote "Director Adam Dasan's writing has been uneven as his narration falls flat at places, and wanders around, without knowing where to move about" and that "he could've been clearer on what he wanted, and concentrated solely on that but the director knows the knack of connecting to audience's emotions, and the scenes pertaining to that work well". Sify.com called the film a "watchable action thriller", stating it was one of Bobby Simha's better films as the lead actor. In their review, The Times of India stated "This film has some moving moments and superb songs by debutant Ajesh, but is let down by the uneven writing, overlong romance portions and a muddled final act".

References

External links 
 

2017 films
2017 action drama films
Indian action drama films
2010s Tamil-language films
2017 directorial debut films